Kapinovo may refer to the following places:

Kapinovo, Dobrich Province, Bulgaria
Kapinovo, Veliko Tarnovo Province, Bulgaria
Kapinovo, Čaška, a village in Čaška Municipality, Republic of North Macedonia